Arthur Edward Powell (September 27, 1882 – March 20, 1969) was a Theosophist whose books were published beginning in the early 1900s. He studied the major esoteric works of Helena Blavatsky, Charles Webster Leadbeater and Annie Besant.

Biography

Arthur E. Powell was born at 'Plas-y-Bryn', a house located in Llanllwchiairn (near Newtown), Montgomeryshire, Wales. He later emigrated to the United States, where he died in Los Angeles, California in 1969. Arthur's parents were Edward Powell (1850-1918) and Mary Eleanor Pughe Pryce-Jones (1859-1944), who married on June 3, 1880. Arthur's father Edward Powell was a solicitor, and Chairman of the Board and Managing Director of the Humber-Hillman Company (an automobile manufacturer). Arthur married twice, his first wife being Hilda (surname not known), and his second wife being Winifred May Fenwick.

Powell joined the Royal Engineers. He served in India as a lieutenant.

Vegetarianism

Powell was a vegetarian. He authored Food And Health in 1909. Powell promoted abstinence from alcohol, coffee, meat, tea and tobacco. His book Food And Health was negatively reviewed in the British Medical Journal as biased and supporting food faddism. The review noted that Powell 'uses quotations from standard medical authors when they can be made to serve his purpose, although they repudiate the conclusions he arrives'. A review in The Lancet journal suggested that 'Lieutenant Powell spoils his own cause, a cause with which we have no quarrel, by attempting to support it by disquisitions on the ethics of killing animals'.

Selected publications

 Food and Health (1909)
 The Etheric Double (1925)
 The Astral Body and Other Astral Phenomena (1927)
 The Mental Body (1927)
 The Causal Body And The Ego (1928)
 The Solar System (1930)
 Human Astral Entities
 The Mastery of Emotion
 Astral Death
 Clairvoyance in Space and Time
 Kundalini
 The Fourth Dimension
 Rebirth
 Discipleship
 Chakras
 The Development of Astral Powers
 Sleep-life
 Dreams
 Invisible Helpers
 The Astral Plane
 Non-human Astral Entities
 Thought Forms
 The Magic of Freemasonry
 Spiritualism
 The Work of a Lodge of the Theosophical Society

References

1882 births
1969 deaths
English Theosophists
Vegetarianism activists